Amara apachensis is a species of beetle of the genus Amara in the family Carabidae.

References

apachensis
Beetles described in 1884
Taxa named by Thomas Lincoln Casey Jr.